Souheil Ayoub (born 19 February 1936) is a Lebanese fencer. He competed in the individual foil event at the 1968 Summer Olympics.

References

External links
 

1936 births
Living people
Lebanese male foil fencers
Olympic fencers of Lebanon
Fencers at the 1968 Summer Olympics
Sportspeople from Beirut